Caraipa jaramilloi is a species of flowering plant in the Calophyllaceae family. It is found only in Peru.

References

jaramilloi
Endemic flora of Peru
Near threatened plants
Taxonomy articles created by Polbot